The 1995–96 Eastern Michigan Eagles men's basketball team represented Eastern Michigan University during the 1995–96 NCAA Division I men's basketball season. The Eagles, led by head coach Ben Braun, played their home games at Bowen Field House and were members of the Mid-American Conference. They finished the season 25–6, 14–4 in MAC play. They were MAC Regular season and MAC tournament champions, and received an automatic bid to the NCAA tournament as No. 9 seed in the Southeast region. The Eagles defeated Duke before falling to No. 1 seed UConn in the second round.

Roster

Source:

Schedule and results 

|-
!colspan=9 style=| Regular season

|-
!colspan=9 style=| MAC tournament

|-
!colspan=9 style=| NCAA tournament

Awards and honors
Ben Braun – MAC Coach of the Year

References

Eastern Michigan Eagles men's basketball seasons
Eastern Michigan
Eastern Michigan
Eastern Michigan Eagles Men's Basketball
Eastern Michigan Eagles Men's Basketball